Rekkame volcanic field is a volcanic field in Morocco. It was active during the Pleistocene until 1.4 million years ago.

References 

Pleistocene volcanoes
Volcanoes of Morocco
Volcanic fields